Highway 11 (Thang Luang Phaendin Mai Lek 11) is a national highway in Thailand.

Road 

 
Considered as an alternative road for Route 1 to the North of Thailand. It begins in Amphoe In Buri, in Singburi Province, at the junction of Thailand Route 32 (National Road 32), and then runs north through Nakhon Sawan Province, Phichit Province, and Phitsanulok Province where, for approximately 10 kilometers, it merges with Highway 12. Next it passes through Uttaradit Province, Phrae Province, Lampang Province, Lamphun Province, and into Chiang Mai Province where, for the final 10 kilometers of the road, it is the so-called Superhighway, a bypass of the city of Chiang Mai. The Highway 11 ends at the intersection of the Superhighway with Huai Kaeo Road (National Road 1004), northwest of the old city of Chiang Mai. In 2019, the four-lane expansion between In Buri and Takhli began.

References 

 ThinkNet:Road Map of Thailand. MapMagic CD + Paper Map.Multi-Purposes Bilingual mapping software, Bangkok, 2008 edition.

National highways in Thailand